The Pimlico Cup Handicap was an American horse race for Thoroughbreds run between 1919 and 1961 at Pimlico Race Course in Baltimore, Maryland. A long-distance race on dirt for stayers age three an older, twenty-three of its twenty-five runnings were run at more than two miles.

Historical notes
Future U. S. Racing Hall of Fame inductee Exterminator won the first three runnings of the Pimlico Cup beginning with the inaugural edition on November 13, 1919.

The race of November 15, 1924, won by Altawood, was run in a snowstorm so heavy at times that the horses were barely visible and the colors undistinguishable.

The Pimlico Cup was not run from 1931 through 1943 as a result of cutbacks necessitated by the Great Depression. Restarting was delayed further by the December 1941 entry of the United States into World War II. On its return in 1944, Megogo set a new track record for 2½ miles with a time of 4:20 1/5.

In 1947 the filly Miss Grillo, trained by future U.S. Racing Hall of Fame inductee Horatio Luro and owned by the Mill River Stable of Josephine Douglas, won the 2½ mile Pimlico Cup by forty lengths. Nearing the finish, Jockey Conn McCreary eased Miss Grillo then stood up in the stirrups and waved to the crowd. The next year Miss Grillo won the race again for Josephine Douglas. Her winning time of 4:14 3/5  broke the world record for 2½ miles by two seconds, a record which had stood for twenty-six years.

Pilaster won the November 12, 1949 edition of the Pimlico Cup running temporarily under the name of trainer Frank Bonsal because owner Henry Lobe Straus had died in an October 25 airplane crash.

Wise Margin's time of 3:37 flat in his 1956 win broke the track record for two miles and a sixteenth. Four years later Beau Diable broke Wise Margin's record when winning the 1960 Pimlico Cup in 3:35 3/5.

The final running of the Pimlico Cup took place on December 9, 1961 on a racetrack covered with snow. It was won by Sunshine Cake owned by Bayard Sharp, a founding director of Delaware Park Racetrack and a former president of The Blood-Horse Inc.

Records
Speed record:
 3:52.20 @ 2 ¼ miles : Edith Cavell
4:14.60 @ 2 ½ miles : Miss Grillo

Most wins:
 3 - Exterminator (1919, 1920, 1921)

Most wins by a jockey:
 2 - Conn McCreary (1947, 1948)
 2 - Nick Shuk (1951, 1956)
 2 - Karl Korte (1958, 1959)

Most wins by a trainer:
 3 - Horatio Luro (1946, 1947, 1948)

Most wins by an owner:
 3 - Willis Sharpe Kilmer (1919, 1920, 1921)

Winners

External links
 Story & photos of Miss Grillo's 1947 and 1948 Pimlico Cup Wins

References

Discontinued horse races
Open long distance horse races
Horse races in Maryland
Pimlico Race Course
Recurring sporting events established in 1919
Recurring sporting events disestablished in 1961